Questacon – The National Science and Technology Centre is an interactive science communication facility in Canberra, Australia. It is a museum with more than 200 interactive exhibits related to science and technology. It has many science programs that are intended to inspire the people of Australia to love science.

Complementing the main museum, Questacon Science Circus is an extensive science outreach program. Every year, the Science Circus engages with more than 100,000 people, travels 25,000 kilometers, runs a professional development courses for 600 teachers, and visits about 30 remote aboriginal communities as well as hospitals, nursing homes, and special schools.

History 
Questacon is an interactive science centre that began as a project of the Australian National University (ANU), in spare space at the Ainslie Public School in Canberra. It opened with 15 exhibits and was staffed entirely by volunteers and by ANU physics lecturer Professor Mike Gore AM,  it inspired him to develop Australia's first interactive science centre, based on the Exploratorium in San Francisco. The name 'Questacon' combines two words— 'quest' meaning 'to discover' and 'con' meaning 'to study'. Professor Gore went on to become the founding Director of Questacon and in 2015, he received an Australia Day honour for his service to science.

Questacon's current building was Japan's present to Australia for the 1988 Bicentenary and it was opened on 23 November 1988. Japanese government and business contributed ¥1 billion, half of the capital cost of A$19.64 million. Questacon was formerly housed at the old Ainslie Primary School.

The director is Jo White who commenced in the role in November 2022, having moved from the Australian Institute of Botanical Science at the Royal Botanic Gardens in Sydney. The previous director, Professor Graham Durant AM, retired in August 2021 having held the role for 19 years. Questacon's vision is "a better future for all Australians through engagement with science and innovation".

Galleries 
In 2020, there were 8 galleries
 The Foyer has a Robot, the Clockwork Universe, the Cam Wave and the Questacon Shop.
 Fundamentals, which explores classic science exhibitions
 Awesome Earth looks at natural disasters and geology, featuring a Tesla coil and an earthquake simulator.
 Q Lab has a dynamic experiment space and includes the Questacon Beehive.
 The Shed contains experimentation with ideas, tools, science, technologies, and art.
 MiniQ is designed for children between the ages of 0 and 6. Exhibits include a water play area, a construction zone, and a quiet area.
 Excite@Q showcases spectacular scientific phenomena including Robot Hockey and the Freefall slide
 Australia in Space looks to the future space exploration
 Mars Gallery has displays from ancient mythologies to modern interactive media.
 Science Garden has interactive sculptures sculptures

Questacon has around 500,000 visitors per year. The galleries are staffed by 200 paid staff, as well as a team of about 60 volunteers.

Science theatre 
The centre also features several performance spaces used for presentations to the general public and student audiences by Questacon's in-house theatre troupe, the "Excited Particles". The Excited Particles also perform puppet shows for young children.

Nkrypt 
Nkrypt is a sculpture installation outside the Questacon building that consists of eight laser-etched stainless steel poles that each carry an encoded message. The outdoor exhibit was installed as a part of the Centenary of Canberra and a prize was offered to the first person to solve the puzzle. This was solved in December 2013.

Questacon Technology Learning Centre
The Questacon Technology Learning Centre is located at the Royal Australian Mint's former administration building in Deakin and houses more than 80 staff. All of the outreach programs and the exhibition developers, including researchers, designers, electronics, metal and wood shop staff are based there. There are also an exhibition area and spaces for booked technology workshops and holiday programs.

Outreach programs 
In addition to the exhibitions in Canberra, Questacon runs the Questacon Science Circus and Engineering is Elementary  nationally and Q2U in the Canberra region. Past outreach programs run by Questacon include the Tenix Questacon Maths Squad, NRMA Roadzone, NRMA Tomorrow's Drivers, Starlab,  Questacon Smart Moves, Questacon Science Play, Questacon Science Squad and a range of activities in remote Indigenous communities.

Questacon Science Circus
The Questacon Science Circus is an outreach program of Questacon and is the most extensive science outreach program of its kind in the world. Each year, the Science Circus engages with more than 100,000 people, travels 25,000 kilometers, runs professional development courses for 600 teachers and visits about 30 remote Indigenous communities as well as hospitals, nursing homes and special schools.

The Questacon Science Circus is a partnership between Questacon and the Australian National University. The Science Circus won the Prime Minister's Award for Community Business Partnerships in 2006.

Fifteen or sixteen science graduates staff the Science Circus as it travels, bringing lively presentations of science to towns and schools. The Science Circus also supports the teaching of science and technology by running practical and fun professional development workshops for teachers. While working for the Science Circus, each presenter also completes a Masters of Science Communication Outreach through the Centre for the Public Awareness of Science at the Australian National University. Coursework includes studies in print media, program evaluation and exhibition design.

Every year the Science Circus presenters graduate from the course and a new team are selected. The first team graduated in 1988 and there are now over 300 Science Circus graduates. Graduates have contributed to programs on Australian Broadcasting Corporation Radio, the Diffusion Science Radio Show, Cosmos Magazine, and The Mr. Science Show podcast.

Photographs

See also

 Inspiring Australia

References

External links

 Official Questacon website
 Current Exhibitions & Shows
 Shell Questacon Science Circus Official Site

Museums in Canberra
Science museums in Australia
Commonwealth Government agencies of Australia
National museums of Australia
1980 establishments in Australia
Science centers
Museums established in 1980
Association of Science-Technology Centers member institutions